The Great Question is a 1915 American silent short romantic drama film written and directed by Thomas Ricketts. The film stars Harold Lockwood, May Allison, Harry von Meter, William Stowell, Eugenie Forde, and Charles Bartlett.

External links

1915 films
1915 romantic drama films
American romantic drama films
American silent short films
American black-and-white films
1915 short films
Films directed by Tom Ricketts
1910s American films
Silent romantic drama films
Silent American drama films